Maurice Allen Kent (September 17, 1885 – April 19, 1966) was a collegiate head coach in three different sports. He coached baseball at Iowa, Wisconsin, Iowa State and Northwestern between 1908 and 1943. Kent was the head basketball coach at Iowa, Iowa State, and Northwestern between 1913 and 1927. And he coached football at Carleton College and Iowa State. 

Kent graduated from the University of Iowa in 1908. He pitched for the Brooklyn Dodgers during the 1912 and 1913 baseball seasons.

Head coaching record

Football

References

External links

 Maury Kent at College Basketball at Sports-Reference.com

1885 births
1966 deaths
Baseball players from Iowa
Basketball coaches from Iowa
Brooklyn Dodgers players
Brooklyn Superbas players
Birmingham Barons players
Major League Baseball pitchers
Memphis Chickasaws players
Carleton Knights athletic directors
Carleton Knights baseball coaches
Carleton Knights football coaches
Carleton Knights men's basketball coaches
Iowa Hawkeyes baseball coaches
Iowa Hawkeyes football coaches
Iowa Hawkeyes football players
Iowa Hawkeyes men's basketball coaches
Iowa State Cyclones baseball coaches
Iowa State Cyclones football coaches
Iowa State Cyclones men's basketball coaches
Northwestern Wildcats baseball coaches
Northwestern Wildcats football coaches
Northwestern Wildcats men's basketball coaches
Sportspeople from Marshalltown, Iowa
Toronto Maple Leafs (International League) players
University of Iowa alumni
Wisconsin Badgers baseball coaches
Oskaloosa Quakers players